Yunusköy can refer to:

 Yunusköy, İspir
 Yunusköy, Kastamonu